Golujeh-ye Khaleseh (also Romanized as Golūjeh-ye Khāleşeh; also known as Kallūcheh, Kaloocheh, Kollūcheh-ye Khāleşeh, Kollūjeh Khāleseh, Kollūjeh-ye Khāleşeh, Kolūcheh, and Kolūcheh-ye Khāleşeh) is a village in Qaflankuh-e Gharbi Rural District, in the Central District of Meyaneh County, East Azerbaijan Province, Iran. At the 2006 census, its population was 1,131, in 273 families.

References 

Populated places in Meyaneh County